Cansu Tiryaki, misspelled as Cansu Tryak, is a Turkish FIFA listed football referee. She is a native of Edirne, Turkey, where she works as a school teacher.

Officiating career

Domestic
Tiryaki started her officiating career as an assistant referee in the 2011-12 Turkish Women's First Football League match on 3 December 2011. She served in this position in various league levels such as  
Amateur Second Division (2012–2014), Regional Amateur League (2012–2015), Amatreur Division (2013), TFF Third League (2013–2014) and  U21 League (2014). Her promotion to referee status was in a U21 League match on 29 August 2015. She officiated from then on in the Regional Amateur League and U21 League. In an U21 League match played on 20 September 2015, she served for the first time as a fourth official. She is still appointed in this position also in the TFF Third League matches. As of 15 March 2020, Tiryaki officiated a total of 84 matches in different roles.

International
Tiryaki debuted internationally in the friendly boys' U16 match between Turkey and Georgia on 12 April 2018. She was named FIFA listed referee for 2018, 2019 and 2020. She served at the 2019 ISF World Schools Championship Football in Belgrade, Serbia. She officiated in two matches at the 2020 UEFA Women's Under-17 Championship qualification matches in Machico, Madeira and Camacha, Portugal. At the second leg match of the 2019–20 UEFA Women's Champions League - Round of 32 between VfL Wolfsburg and KFF Mitrovica on 25 September 2019, she served as the fourth official. She was the fourth official of the UEFA Women's Euro 2021 qualifying Group B match between Malta and Bosnia and Herzegovina on 10 March 2020. On 3 September that year, she officiated the UEFA Women's Euro 2021 qualifying Group B match between Bosnia and Herzegovina and Malta held in Sarajevo, Bosnia and Herzegovina.

References

Living people
Sportspeople from Edirne
Turkish schoolteachers
Turkish football referees
Turkish sportswomen
Women association football referees
Year of birth missing (living people)